This page is a list of saints, blesseds, venerables, and Servants of God from Oceania, as recognized by the Roman Catholic Church. These people were born, died, or lived their religious life in any of the states or territories of Oceania.

The region of Oceania was the last continent where the Catholic Church arrived. Consequently, it is the continent with the fewest saints.

List of saints

The following is the list of saints, including the year in which they were canonized and the country or countries with which they are associated.

 Peter Chanel, Marist priest (1954, Wallis and Futuna)
 Father Damien, priest of the Congregation of the Sacred Hearts of Jesus and Mary (2009, Hawaii)
 Mary MacKillop, founder of the Sisters of Saint Joseph of the Sacred Heart of Jesus (2010, Australia)
 Pedro Calungsod, layman (2012, Guam)
 Marianne Cope, Franciscan sister (2012, Hawaii)

List of blesseds

 Diego Luis de San Vitores, Jesuit priest (Guam)
 Giovanni Battista Mazzucconi, PIME priest (Papua New Guinea)
 Peter To Rot, layman (Papua New Guinea)

List of venerables
 Suzanne Aubert, religious (New Zealand)
 Alain-Marie Guynot de Boismenu, bishop with the Sacred Heart Missionaries (Papua New Guinea)

Other open causes
Others have been proposed for beatification, and may have active groups supporting their causes. These include:

 Leopoldina Burns
 Eileen O'Connor
 B. A. Santamaria
 Martyrs during World War II, including:
 Sister Teresia, a sister from Papua New Guinea with the Daughters of Mary Immaculate who died in 1946 as a result of torture by the Japanese occupiers.
 Sister Cicilia and ten other native Marianist sisters who died in service during the Japanese occupation in air raids, POW camps, or otherwise.
 Magdalena Aiwaul, a native from Tumleo Island who wished to join the Missionary Sisters Servants of the Holy Spirit and was shot aboard the Japanese destroyer Akikaze after being arrested with the Sisters.
 Bishop Joseph Loerks (or Lörks), German Vicar Apostolic of Central New Guinea (now the Roman Catholic Diocese of Wewak), also shot aboard the Japanese destroyer Akikaze.
 Forty-six or more others, companions of the above, also shot aboard the Japanese destroyer Akikaze.
 Charlie, Allan and Dora Mathies; Jimi Johnson; Elsie Kraemer; Paula; and two unnamed teenagers, laypeople working at the missions of Papua New Guinea killed aboard the Yorishime Maru.
 Arthur C. Duhamel, Marist, killed on Guadalcanal.
 James Gerard Hennessey, killed aboard the Montevideo Maru.
 Marist brothers Augustine (Frederick Gerard Mannes), Donatus and Ervin, missing during the occupation of the Solomon Islands.
 Vernon Francis Douglas, a New Zealand Columban priest killed by Japanese soldiers in 1943 in the Philippines having demonstrated outstanding priestly fidelity (especially to the Seal of Confession).

See also
Roman Catholicism in Australia
Roman Catholicism in New Zealand
Roman Catholicism in Papua New Guinea
Roman Catholicism in Guam
Roman Catholic Diocese of Honolulu
Roman Catholicism in Wallis and Futuna
List of American saints and beatified people
List of saints of the Canary Islands

References

External links
 "Hagiography Circle"
 "Brother Augustine"

Lists of saints by place